Joyce Wethered, Lady Heathcoat-Amory (17 November 1901 – 18 November 1997) was a golfer regarded as the leading British woman player of the inter-war period.

Joyce learned the game as a child, as did her brother Roger, who lost a playoff for the 1921 Open Championship. Joyce won the British Ladies Amateur four times (1922, 1924, 1925, and 1929) and the English Ladies' Amateur Championship for five consecutive years (1920–24).

She married Sir John Heathcoat-Amory in 1937, and became Lady Heathcoat-Amory. Her play and swing were greatly admired by Bobby Jones, the American champion of the same era. Jones, who played several exhibition rounds with her, had a very high regard for her game. She essentially retired from competitive play by 1930.

She played most of her golf at (and was a member of) Worplesdon Golf Club in Surrey. She was inducted into the World Golf Hall of Fame in 1975.

An exhibition of memorabilia can be seen at Knightshayes Court in Devon, where she lived.

Team appearances
Amateur
Vagliano Trophy (representing Great Britain & Ireland): 1931 (winners)
Curtis Cup (representing Great Britain & Ireland): 1932 (playing captain)
Women's Home Internationals (representing England): 1921 (winners), 1922 (winners), 1923 (winners), 1924 (winners), 1925 (winners), 1929 (winners)

Bibliography
 Wethered, Joyce Golfing Memories and Methods (1933) Hutchinson
Knighthayes National Trust guide 2013,

External links
Articles on and by Joyce Wethered
Joyce Wethered - The greatest Golfer ever?
Electronic Resources From SoHG Archives
Joyce Wethered Swing Sequences  From SoHG Master Classes

English female golfers
Amateur golfers
Winners of ladies' major amateur golf championships
World Golf Hall of Fame inductees
Wives of baronets
1901 births
1997 deaths